Aeja's Older Sister, Minja is a 2008 South Korean television series starring Cha Hwa-yeon, Lee Eung-kyung, So Yi-hyun and Song Yi-woo. The daily drama aired on SBS from April 21 to October 31, 2008, on Mondays to Fridays at 19:20 (KST) for 140 episodes.

Cast

Main
 Cha Hwa-yeon as Joo Min-ja
 Lee Eung-kyung as Joo Ae-ja
 So Yi-hyun as Lee Chae-rin, Min-ja's daughter
 Song Yi-woo as Han Se-ah, Ae-ja's daughter

Supporting
 In Gyo-jin as Park Ha-jin
 Jung Jae-soon as Park Bok-nyeo, Min-ja's mother
 Lee Deok-hwa as Han Beom-man, Ae-ja's husband
 Lee Kyung-shil as Lee Ki-ja, Min-ja's husband's sister
 Yoo Seung-bong as Go Man-sik, Ki-ja's husband
 Yoon Da-hoon as Lee Dal-geon, Min-ja's husband's younger brother
 Kim Min-hee as Goo Won-ja, Min-ja's sister-in-law
 Lee Ji-woo as Lee Da-rin, Dal-geon's daughter
 Han Jin-hee as Park Jang-hyun, Ha-jin's father
 Ha Mi-hye as Ha Mi-joo, Ha-jin's mother
 Shi On as Park Ji-ae, Ha-jin's younger sister
 Seo Sang-won as Park Dong-jin, Ha-jin's younger brother
 Jo Eun-deok as Choong Joo-daek
 Kim Hyun-jin as Kim Joon-seok, Joo-daek's son
 Im Sung-min as Na Joo-ri
 Lee Ji-hyun as Oh Yang-geum, Chae-rin's friend
 Hong Seok-cheon as Heo Goo-hyung
 Park Ji-yeon as Maeng Na-yeon
 Kim Ha-yoon as Eun-jung
 Kim So-ri as Oh Ji-hyun
 Kim Woo-hyun as Kim Joon-seok
 Jung Ki-sung as Chang-woo

Notes

References

External links
Aeja's Older Sister, Minja official SBS website 

Seoul Broadcasting System television dramas
Korean-language television shows
2008 South Korean television series debuts
2008 South Korean television series endings
South Korean romance television series